Oxyglychus laeviventris is a species of beetle in the family Carabidae, the only species in the genus Oxyglychus.

References

Pterostichinae